opened in the Batō area of Nakagawa, Tochigi Prefecture, Japan, in 2000. In a prize-winning building designed by Kuma Kengo, the museum's collection includes nikuhitsu-ga by Hiroshige, woodblock prints of the Utagawa school, Meiji-period prints by Kobayashi Kiyochika, and works by Kawamura Kiyoo.

See also
 Tochigi Prefectural Museum of Fine Arts

References

External links

 Nakagawa-machi Batō Hiroshige Museum of Art
 Works from Nakagawa-machi Bato Hiroshige Museum of Art

Museums in Tochigi Prefecture
Art museums and galleries in Japan
Nakagawa, Tochigi
Art museums established in 2000
2000 establishments in Japan
Ukiyo-e Museum